The Darker Instinct is the third studio album by Swedish rock band Takida. It was recorded at Big Island Sound in Stockholm, Sweden. The album was released on September 2, 2009.
The album entered the Swedish album chart at No. 1 and was certified gold after just one week of sales.

The album charted for a total of 41 weeks and was certified platinum during 2010.

Track listing
 "Get Me Started" 3:52
 "As You Die" 3:31
 "End Is Near" 3:32
 "Never Alone Always Alone" 4:05
 "The Things We Owe" 3:43
 "Deadlock" 3:27
 "Walk On By" 4:16
 "Caroline" 3:21
 "Hours" 4:11
 "Between the Lines" 3:50
 "Tonight" 3:43
 "Trigger" 4:02
 "Too Late" 4:22

Chart performance

Release history
{|class="wikitable"
|-
!  Region
!  Date
!  Format
!  Label
|-
|Finland
| style="text-align:left;"|September 30, 2009
|CD, digital download
|rowspan="2"|Universal Music
|-
|Sweden
| style="text-align:left;"|September 11, 2009
|CD, digital download
|-

References

Takida albums
2009 albums